The Arieș is a river in Romania, a tributary of the Mureș.

Arieș may also refer to the following places in Romania:

Arieș, a tributary of the Râul Mic in Alba County
Arieș (Someș), a tributary of the Someș 
Baia de Arieș, a town in Alba County

See also 
 Aries (disambiguation)